Aluchalu may refer to:
Artsvanist, Armenia - formerly Nerkin Aluchalu
Verkhniy Aluchalu, Armenia